Eric Feron is a computer scientist and aerospace engineer. He has been the Dutton/Ducoffe Professor of Aerospace Software Engineering at Georgia Tech since 2005.

He taught at MIT's department of Aeronautics and Astronautics from 1993 until his appointment at Georgia Tech. He obtained his BS from Ecole Polytechnique, his MS from Ecole Normale Suprieure, and PhD from Stanford University. His particular research foci are aerobatic control of unmanned aerial vehicles, multi-agent operations, including air traffic control systems and aerospace software system certification. One of his students at MIT was Selçuk Bayraktar, the designer of the Bayraktar TB2 drone.

Selected research
Frazzoli, Emilio, Munther A. Dahleh, and Eric Feron. "Maneuver-based motion planning for nonlinear systems with symmetries." IEEE transactions on robotics 21.6 (2005): 1077–1091.
Frazzoli, Emilio, Munther A. Dahleh, and Eric Feron. "Real-time motion planning for agile autonomous vehicles." Journal of guidance, control, and dynamics 25.1 (2002): 116–129.
Schouwenaars, Tom, et al. "Mixed integer programming for multi-vehicle path planning." 2001 European control conference (ECC). IEEE, 2001.
Boyd, Stephen, et al. Linear matrix inequalities in system and control theory. Vol. 15. Siam, 1994.

References

Georgia Tech faculty
École Polytechnique alumni
École Normale Supérieure alumni
Stanford University alumni
Computer scientists
Aerospace engineers
Living people
Year of birth missing (living people)